Fink (from German, meaning finch) is a surname and may refer to:

People
 Aaron Fink (musician), guitarist of Breaking Benjamin
 Aaron Fink (artist) (born 1955), American artist
 Albert Fink (1827–1897), German-born civil engineer noted for the "Fink truss," developer of cost accounting, said to be America’s leading railroad engineer, President of the American Society of Engineers, effectively America’s first Secretary of Commerce.
 Ashley Fink (born 1986), American actress
 Bernarda Fink (born 1955), Argentinian mezzo-soprano
 Bruce Fink (1861–1927), American lichenologist
 Bruce Fink, American Lacanian psychoanalyst
 Cristina Fink (born 1964), Mexican high jumper
 Denman Fink (1880–1956), American artist and magazine illustrator.
 Eugen Fink (1905–1975), German philosopher
 Gottfried Wilhelm Fink (1783–1846), German composer, music theorist, poet and Protestant clergyman
 Heinrich Fink (1935–2020), German politician)
 Jens Fink-Jensen (born 1956), Danish artist and poet
 Jesse Fink (born 1973), British-Australian author
 John Fink (born 1940), American actor
 Kathryn Ferguson Fink (1917–1989), American biochemist 
 Larry Fink (photographer), (born 1941), American photographer
 Laurence D. Fink (born 1952), American businessman
 Leon Fink (historian) (born 1948), American historian
 Doctor Fink, stage name of Matthew Fink, American musician associated with Prince
 Michael Fink (born 1982), German footballer
 Olaf Fink (1914–1973), American educator and state senator
 Orenda Fink (born 1975), American musician
 Patricia Fink (born 1960), singer in Japan
 Paulette Fink (1911–2005), French Jewish nurse and resistance worker 
 Peter Thomas Fink (known as Tom), former Australian Chief Defence Scientist 1978–1986
 Robert O. Fink (1905–1988), American papyrologist
 Shaney Fink, American volleyball player and Athletic Director at Seattle University
 Stanley Fink (1936–1997), American lawyer and politician
 Stanley Fink (finance) (born 1957), British hedge fund executive
 Theodore Fink (1855–1942), Australian politician, newspaper proprietor and educationist
 Thomas Fink (born 1972), Anglo-American statistical physicist
 Thomas Fink (poet) (born 1954), American poet and literary critic
 Thorsten Fink (born 1967), German coach and former footballer
 Tom Fink (1928–2021), mayor of Anchorage, Alaska
 Uri Fink (born 1963), Israeli comic book artist
 Walter Fink (1930–2018), German patron of music

Fictional people
 Barton Fink, the title character of a movie by the Coen Brothers
 Gussie Fink-Nottle, a recurring character in P.G. Wodehouse's novels
 Mike Fink (1770–1823), a figure of American folklore
 Wilhelm Fink, alias of Green Day frontman Billie Joe Armstrong

See also
 Finck
 Fincke
 Finke
 Finckel
 Finkel
 Finkl
 Vink (disambiguation)

German-language surnames
Informal personal names
Jewish surnames
Surnames from nicknames